Jan Hucl (born August 18, 1990) is a Czech professional ice hockey defenceman. He played with HC Plzeň in the Czech Extraliga during the 2010–11 Czech Extraliga season.

References

External links

1990 births
Living people
Czech ice hockey defencemen
HC Plzeň players